Tati Siding is a village located in the North-East District of Botswana. It had 8,112 inhabitants at the 2011 census.

See also
 List of cities in Botswana

References

Populated places in Botswana